The bright-rumped attila or polymorphic attila (Attila spadiceus) is a small passerine bird in the tyrant flycatcher family (Tyrannidae). It breeds from northwestern Mexico to western Ecuador, Bolivia and southeastern Brazil, and on Trinidad.

Description 

The bright-rumped attila is a large tyrant flycatcher with a big head, hooked and slightly upturned bill and upright stance. The head is olive-green streaked with black, the back is chestnut or olive, the rump bright yellow and the tail brown. The wings are dark brown with two pale wing bars and paler feather edging. The whitish or yellow throat and yellow breast are variably streaked darker. The belly is white becoming yellow near the tail. The iris is red. The sexes are similar, but young birds have a cinnamon-fringed crown and brown eyes.

The plumage is very variable, but the streaking below and obvious wingbars help in distinguishing this species from others in the genus. The calls include a loud beat-it, beat-it and a plaintive ooo weery weery weery weery woo. It does not move when singing, so can be difficult to see.

Ecology 
Central American birds have slightly different song structures and also tend towards lighter ochre plumage independent of Gloger's Rule; they are sometimes separated as flammulated attila (Attila flammulatus) . Their characteristic song given at dawn has been analyzed in detail: it has a very variable number of weerys which may become weery'os, and often ends in a woo-whit; a finite state machine has been developed to simulate this structure. However, due to the highly variable songs more data is required before the technically plausible split can be accepted; the AOU has so far refrained from formally acknowledging it.

The bright-rumped attila is a common bird from the lowlands to  ASL. It occurs in forests, second growth, pasture and plantations with trees, and shady gardens, and apparently it can tolerate a considerable amount of habitat destruction. It is an active, aggressive and noisy species, usually seen alone. It eats insects, spiders, frogs and lizards taken from vegetation or the ground. It will pursue prey on foot as well as attacking in short sallies, and will follow army ant columns. It also takes many fruits (such as from gumbo-limbo Bursera simaruba, and less frequently from Cymbopetalum mayanum) and seeds.

The nest is a deep cup of mosses, leaves and plant fibre; it may be built usually below 3m high amongst epiphyte, between buttress roots or in a bank, not necessarily in the forest. The typical clutch is two lilac- or rufous-marked dull white or pink eggs. Incubation by the female is 14–15 days to hatching, with another 17 days to fledging.

Footnotes

References
 Foster, Mercedes S. (2007): The potential of fruiting trees to enhance converted habitats for migrating birds in southern Mexico. Bird Conservation International 17(1): 45–61.  PDF fulltext
 Hilty, Steven L. (2003): Birds of Venezuela. Christopher Helm, London. 
 Leger, Daniel W. (2005): First documentation of combinatorial song syntax in a suboscine passerine species. Condor 107(4): 765–774.  PDF fulltext
 Stiles, F. Gary & Skutch, Alexander Frank (1989): A guide to the birds of Costa Rica. Comistock, Ithaca. 
 Salaman, Paul G.W.; Stiles, F. Gary; Bohórquez, Clara Isabel; Álvarez-R., Mauricio; Umaña, Ana María; Donegan, Thomas M. & Cuervo, Andrés M. (2002): New and noteworthy bird records from the east slope of the Andes of Colombia. Caldasia 24(1): 157–189. PDF fulltext

External links 
Bright-rumped attila videos on the Internet Bird Collection
Bright-rumped attila photo gallery VIREO
Photo-High Res; Article tropicalbirding
Photo-High Res; Article cayaya-birding Page 1; Page 0

bright-rumped attila
Birds of the Amazon Basin
Birds of the Atlantic Forest
Birds of the Guianas
Birds of Trinidad and Tobago
Birds of Colombia
Birds of Venezuela
Birds of Ecuador
Birds of Central America
Birds of the Yucatán Peninsula
Birds of Mexico
bright-rumped attila
bright-rumped attila
Birds of Brazil
Birds of the Sierra Madre Occidental